Cynthia Cristina Lander Zamora (born June 10, 1982, in Caracas) is a Venezuelan actress, TV host and beauty-pageant titleholder who represented her country at Miss Universe 2002 and Miss International 2002.

Personal life
Born in Caracas, Lander moved to the United States at age 11 and returned to Venezuela when she was 16.

On September 24, 2011, Lander married her boyfriend of two years, businessman Carlos Martel Izaguirre.

Pageant participation

Miss Venezuela 2001
Lander participated in Miss Venezuela 2001 representing Distrito Capital where she beat out 25 other women for the title of Miss Venezuela 2001, gaining the right to represent her country at Miss Universe 2002.

Miss Universe 2002
Lander represented Venezuela at Miss Universe 2002, held on May 29, 2002, in San Juan, Puerto Rico, finishing as 4th Runner-Up.

Miss International 2002
Lander was also appointed to compete in Miss International 2002, held on September 30, 2002, in Tokyo, Japan, failing to place in the semifinals.

Facts
 She received firefighter training prior to the Miss Universe 2002 contest. She was motivated to work with the firefighters due to the Vargas tragedy that occurred in Vargas State, Venezuela in December 1999.
 She is related to Miss Venezuela 1981 and Miss Universe 1981 Irene Sáez.

See also
 Miss Venezuela

References

External links

1982 births
Living people
Miss International 2002 delegates
Miss Universe 2002 contestants
Miss Venezuela winners
Venezuelan people of German descent
People from Caracas